Artur de Sacadura Freire Cabral, GCTE (23 May 1881 – 15 November 1924), known simply as Sacadura Cabral, was a Portuguese aviation pioneer. He, together with fellow aviator Gago Coutinho, conducted the first flight across the South Atlantic Ocean in 1922, and also the first using only astronomical navigation, from Lisbon, Portugal, to Rio de Janeiro, Brazil.

Disappearance and aftermath
On 15 November 1924, he disappeared while flying over the English Channel, along with his co-pilot, Mechanical Corporal José Correia, due to fog and his shortening eyesight (which never kept him from flying). Although some mechanical wreckage from his seaplane was discovered four days later, the bodies were never recovered.

A statue dedicated to them is located in Lisbon. Another statue is located in his hometown, Celorico da Beira. He was the granduncle of Portuguese politicians Miguel Portas and Paulo Portas.

See also 
List of people who disappeared mysteriously at sea

Gallery

References

External links

1881 births
1920s missing person cases
1924 deaths
Aviation pioneers
Missing aviators
Missing person cases in Europe
People from Celorico da Beira
People who died at sea
Portuguese aviators
Transatlantic flight
Victims of aviation accidents or incidents in the United Kingdom
Recipients of the Order of the Tower and Sword